This is a list of regions commonly used in Latin America.

Geopolitical regions

 Central America
 Caribbean (only partially)
 Southern Cone

Geographic regions
Mexico
Gulf of Mexico
Bajio
Huasteca
Totonacapan
Republic of the Rio Grande
Republic of Yucatán
Chiapas
Mexican Altiplano

Caribbean
Antilles
Greater Antilles
Lesser Antilles
Grenadines
Lucayan archipelago
Central America
Isthmus of Panama
Mosquito Coast
Soconusco
South America
Amazon basin
Andes
Altiplano
Altiplano Cundiboyacense
Puna de Atacama
Wet Andes
Argentine Northwest
Atacama Desert
Brazilian Highlands
Caribbean South America
Chilean Central Valley
Cuyo
Gran Chaco
Guianas
Llanos
Mesopotamia
Pampas
Pantanal
Patagonia
Darien gap
Paraneña
Cerrado
Tierra del Fuego
Fjord of the Mountains
Isthmus of Tehuantepec
Isthmus of Panama
Isthmus of Rivas
Zulia
Comahue

Historical regions
Aridoamerica
Oasisamerica
Mesoamerica
Las Californias
Misiones Orientales
Guayrá
South Peru
North Peru
Republic of Sonora
Dutch Brazil
France Antarctique
Equinoctial France
Araucanía
Futahuillimapu
La Frontera region of Chile
Los Llanos, Chile
Mosquito Coast
Patagonia
Acre
Litoral Department (formerly Bolivia's coast)
Suyus of the Inca Empire
Chinchay Suyu
Antisuyu
Qullasuyu
Kuntisuyu

Cultural regions

Iberoamerica, regions where an Iberian language is spoken.

Hispanoamerica, regions where the Spanish/Castilian language is spoken.

North America 
Aridoamerica – northern Mexico and portions of the American Southwest.
Aztlan
Comancheria
Apacheria
Oasisamerica –  the American Southwest and portions of Northern Mexico.
Mesoamerica –  Central and southern Mexico, Belize, Guatemala, Honduras, El Salvador, Nicaragua, Costa Rica. These cultures have roots in advanced ancient civilizations such as the Aztec and Maya.
Central America –  Belize, Costa Rica, El Salvador, Guatemala, Honduras, Panama, Nicaragua, and Archipelago of San Andrés, Providencia and Santa Catalina (legally part of Colombia, but off the coast of Central America.) Consists mainly of former territories of the Federal Republic of Central America.

Spanish Caribbean 
Las Antillas Occidentales –  Cuba, Puerto Rico, Spanish Virgin Islands, Dominican Republic. This region is highly influenced by the Canary Islanders and the African slaves that settled in the region during the Age of Exploration.
Lesser Antilles. Influenced and colonized by other European empires
West Indies Federation
Caribbean Mainland –  Coastal and island regions of Mexico (such as the Riviera Maya, Cozumel, and Isla Mujeres), Belize, Guatemala, Nicaragua, Honduras, Costa Rica, Panama, Colombia, and Venezuela. Historic trade across the Caribbean Sea between these nations have created many cultural similarities.
Florida –  although not in the Caribbean Sea, the US State of Florida has been historically and culturally tied to the Spanish Caribbean since Spanish have settled in the age of the Spanish Empire.

South America 
Gran Colombia –  Colombia, Ecuador, Panama, Venezuela, and Northern Peru. Although Gran Colombia dissolved in 1831, members of this region still share many cultural attributes in terms of food, language, music, and history.
Peru-Bolivian Confederation
Andean regions –  Colombia, Ecuador, Peru, Northern Chile, Bolivia, and northwestern Argentina. Much of the culture found in this region can be traced back to the Inca Empire. Quechua is still spoken as a second language in many of these regions.
Gaucho regions – Argentina, Uruguay and southern Brazil. The culture of these regions were heavily influenced by the South American cowboy, known as the gaucho.
Rioplatense region –  Argentina, Uruguay, Brazil, and parts of Paraguay. This region, due to extensive immigration from Europe, mainly from Italy, Spain, and Portugal maintains a very European culture in terms of cuisine, art, architecture, and dialect. Many Italian loanwords are used in the dialect of the region, Rioplatense Spanish. 
Mapuche world
Futahuillimapu
Wallmapu
Puelmapu

Lusoamerica, regions where the Portuguese language is spoken.

Brazil 
South – Paraná, Rio Grande do Sul, Santa Catarina. Much of the culture of this region is derived from European immigrants, mainly from Italy and Germany.
Central-West – Goiás, Mato Grosso and Mato Grosso do Sul. Culture is derived from livestock herders.
Northeast – Maranhão, Piauí, Ceará, Rio Grande do Norte, Paraiba, Pernambuco, Alagoas, Sergipe and Bahia, Fernando de Noronha. Syncretic culture of Portuguese and African elements. Heavily influenced by the African slave trade.
North-Acre, Amapá, Amazonas, Pará, Rondônia, Roraima. Mestizo culture blending indigenous, Portuguese, Spanish and French elements.
Southeast – Espírito Santo, Minas Gerais, Rio de Janeiro and São Paulo. Cosmopolitan region of heavily blended African, European, and indigenous cultures.

Guianas
Portuguese Guiana (Now Amapa)
Dutch Guiana (Now Suriname)
British Guiana (Now Guyana)
Spanish Guiana
French Guiana

l'Amérique francophone, regions where the French language is spoken.

North America, comprising Anglicized and Americanized French cultures.
Louisiana, one of the 50 states in the United States.
Quebec, a province in Canada.
Saint Pierre and Miquelon.

Caribbean, comprising mainly Africanized French cultures.
Guadeloupe
Haiti 
Martinique 
Saint Barthelemy 
French Guiana 
Inini
Saint-Martin

Ecological regions 

Galápagos
Interandean Valles
Mesoamerican Biological Corridor
Caatinga
By country:
List of ecoregions in Brazil
:Category:Ecoregions of Bolivia
List of ecoregions in Chile
List of ecoregions in Cuba
List of ecoregions in Mexico
Natural regions of Peru

Latin America
Latin America
Latin America-related lists
Regions of the Americas